Melodies is the eighth studio album recorded by Japanese singer-songwriter Tatsuro Yamashita, released in June 1983. It was his first LP issued under the Moon Label which was distributed by Alfa Records at the time.

Unlike his previous albums, where Minako Yoshida wrote most of the lyrics, most of the songs heard on Melodies are penned by Yamashita alone, except for "Blue Midnight" (co-written by Yoshida) and a cover version of "Guess I'm Dumb" (composed by Brian Wilson and Russ Titelman and originally recorded by Glen Campbell in 1966).

Before the album came out, "Koukiatsu Girl" was released as a lead single. It features chorus by Mariya Takeuchi, who married Yamashita in 1982 and then temporarily suspended her recording career. The most well-known song in this album is "Christmas Eve". The song did not receive much attention when it was released on 12-inch single in December 1983, but it was widely recognized through a series of television advertisements by the Central Japan Railway Company aired during the late 1980s and early 1990s. The CD single of "Christmas Eve" reissued in 1986 subsequently became a huge commercial success, topping the chart in December 1989. The song was repeatedly reissued in later years and became a hit throughout the decades, entering the Oricon chart for over 20 consecutive years with sales of more than 1.8 million copies in total.

Because of the massive success "Christmas Eve" gained, the album also enjoyed long-term commercial success. Melodies is Yamashita's best selling studio album, retailing over 992,000 copies during its two first chart runs. In 2013 the 30th anniversary reissue sold 28,000 more copies, pushing the album total to 1 million and 20,000 copies.

Track listing

Personnel
Tatsuro Yamashita: Drums, bass guitar, electric guitar, acoustic guitar, 12-string guitar, electric sitar, celesta, electric piano, acoustic piano, vibe, Hammond organ, glocken, timpani, percussion, echoes, background vocals  
Kohki Itoh – Bass guitar
Tsunehide Matsuki – Electric guitar
Hiroyuki Namba – Electric piano, acoustic piano, Hammond organ
Motoya Hamaguchi – Percussion
Jun Aoyama – Drums
Satoshi Nakamura – Oberheim OBX-a synthesizer 
Hidefumi Toki – Alto sax
Susumu Kazuhara – Trumpet 
Masahiro Kobayashi – Trumpet
Shigeharu Mukai – Trombone 
Tadanori Konakawa – Trombone
Daisuke Inoue: Tenor sax
Takeru Muraoka – Tenor sax
Shunzo Sunahara – Baritone sax
Ohno Group – Strings
Keiko Yamakawa – Harp 
Mariya Takeuchi – Chorus (credited to the Kokiatsu-Girls)
Kumi Sano – Chorus (credited to the Kokiatsu-Girls)
Manaho Mori – Chorus (credited to the Kokiatsu-Girls)
Kazuhito Murata – Chorus (credited to a Kokiatsu-Boy)

Production
Produced and arranged by Tatsuro Yamashita (for Smile Co.)
Mixed and Remixed by Tamotsu Yoshida
Associate producer: Nobumasa Uchida
Assistant engineer: Masato Ohmori
Recorded at CBS/Sony Roppongi Studio A & B
Remixed at CBS/Sony Roppongi Studio B
Mastering studio: CBS/Sony Shinanomachi Mastering Studio
CD Mastering Engineer: Teppei Kasai
Management office: Wild Honey
Assistant management: Kentaro Hattori, Masayuki Matsumoto & Kimmy Satoh
Copyright management: Kenichi Nomura
Masterright Owned by Smile Co.
Executive producer: Ryuzo "Junior" Kosugi
Art direction: Hiroshi Takahara
Design: Hiroshi Takahara, Akira Utsumi, Mayumi Oka
Photographer: Kaoru Iijima
Illustration for inner sleeve: Midori Murakami
Lettering: Tadashi Yokoshi

Chart positions

Weekly charts

Year-end charts

Awards

Release history

References

Tatsuro Yamashita albums
1983 albums